Old Hall Green is a hamlet in Hertfordshire, England. At the 2011 Census the population  was included in the civil parish of Standon.

In 1793, an academy, St. Edmund's College, Ware, was established there which provided a school for Catholic boys and a seminary to train priests serving England's recusant community.  St Edmund's College was one of two facilities which replaced the English College at Douai, which had to be evacuated because of the French Revolution. Whilst the school remains, the seminary was moved to Chelsea in 1975.

See also
 Old Hall Manuscript

Notes

External links

Hamlets in Hertfordshire
East Hertfordshire District